Juan Daniel Forlín (born 10 January 1988) is an Argentine professional footballer who plays for Spanish club CF Badalona Futur. Mainly a central defender, he can also operate as a defensive midfielder.

He started out at Boca Juniors, then spent four years in La Liga with Espanyol, appearing in 118 official matches and scoring two goals.

Club career
Born in Reconquista, Santa Fe, Forlín made his Primera División debut on 19 April 2008 as his team Boca Juniors won 2–1 against Newell's Old Boys. In his first full season, he was an undisputed starter as the Buenos Aires-based side conquered the 2008 Apertura.

Forlín was signed by RCD Espanyol from Spain on 25 August 2009 – alongside Boca teammate Facundo Roncaglia – on a five-year deal, with the Catalans paying a fee of €4 million for 70% of his rights. He made his La Liga debut on 12 September in a 0–3 home loss against Real Madrid, and scored in his next appearance, a 3–2 win at Deportivo de La Coruña, finishing his debut campaign with 24 appearances, receiving 11 yellow cards and being sent off once.

During his spell with the Pericos, Forlín was regularly used by his compatriot Mauricio Pochettino as both a central defender and a defensive midfielder. The same befell him under Javier Aguirre, who was appointed in November 2012.

On 20 July 2013, Forlín moved to Al-Rayyan SC in Qatar for an undisclosed fee. He was released by the club in July 2015.

Honours
Boca Juniors
Argentine Primera División: Apertura 2008

Querétaro
Copa MX: Apertura 2016

References

External links

1988 births
Living people
People from Reconquista, Santa Fe
Sportspeople from Santa Fe Province
Argentine footballers
Association football defenders
Association football midfielders
Association football utility players
Argentine Primera División players
Boca Juniors footballers
La Liga players
Segunda División players
Segunda División B players
Primera Federación players
Segunda Federación players
Real Madrid Castilla footballers
RCD Espanyol footballers
Real Oviedo players
UE Costa Brava players
Qatar Stars League players
Al-Rayyan SC players
Liga MX players
Querétaro F.C. footballers
Júbilo Iwata players
Argentine expatriate footballers
Expatriate footballers in Spain
Expatriate footballers in Qatar
Expatriate footballers in Mexico
Expatriate footballers in Japan
Argentine expatriate sportspeople in Spain
Argentine expatriate sportspeople in Qatar
Argentine expatriate sportspeople in Mexico
Argentine expatriate sportspeople in Japan